Hebei Township is a township under the administration of Keshan County, in western Heilongjiang, China. , it has nine villages under its administration:
Xinda Village
Xinjian Village
Xinnong Village
Xin'an Village
Xincheng Village
Xinzhong Village
Xinqi Village
Xinsheng Village
Xinmin Village

References 

Township-level divisions of Heilongjiang
Keshan County